Ahmet Civan Canova (28 June 1955 – 20 August 2022) was a Turkish actor, playwright and theatre director.

Life and career 
Canova was the son of Turkish director Mahir Canova. He was a graduate of TED Ankara College (1973). He started his career as an actor by making his cinematic debut in Yılmaz Güney's 1974 movie Arkadaş. In the same year, he enrolled in the Ankara State Conservatory's Theater Department. After four years of studying, he joined the crew of Turkish State Theatres. Aside from his acting career both on stage and in front of the camera, he is known for his plays. Between 1998–2004, he was married to actress Açelya Akkoyun. Canova continued to work for the State Theatres.

He died after a lengthy battle with lung cancer on 20 August 2022, at the age of 67.

Plays written 
 Düğün Şarkısı
 Erkekler Tuvaleti
 Evaristo
 Ful Yaprakları
 Gala
 Kör Buluşma
 Kızıl Ötesi Aydınlık
 MitosMorfos
 Neon
 Niobe
 Sokağa Çıkma Yasağı
 Üstat Harpagona Saygı ve Destek Gecesi

Filmography

Film 
 Arkadaş (1974) as Halil
 Nehir (1977) as Engin 
 Yaşamak Bu Değil (1981) as Fatih 
 Mutlu Ol Yeter (1981)
 Berduşlar (1982) as Kenan 
 Yıkılan Gurur (1983) as Naci
 Hırsız (1986)
 Acı Lokma (1986) as Ömer 
 Sokaktaki Adam (1995)
 80. Adım (1996) as Sedat 
 Sır (1997)
 Ömerçip (2003) as Celal
 Eve Dönüş (2006) as İşkenceci Polis
 72. Koğuş (2010) as Hilmi
 F Tipi

Television   
 Yalancı Şafak (1990)
 Bizim Aile (1995) as Ataç
 Çiçek Taksi (2000) as Celal Kıraç
 Gece Yürüyüşü (2004) as Cüneyt
 Çeşm-i Bülbül (2005)
 Esir Kalpler (2006) as Ekrem Akerman 
 Arka Sokaklar (2007) as Nazım Tahsin 
 Eksik Etek (2007)
 Sınıf (2008) as Şeref
 Ay Işığı (2008) as Yıldırım Duman
 Sensiz Yaşayamam (2010) as Mummer
 Fatmagül'ün Suçu Ne? (2011–12) as Kadir
 Karadayı (2012)
 Her Sevda Bir Veda (2014)
 Paramparça (2014) as Rahmi Gürpinar
 Atiye (2019–21) as Mustafa Özgürsoy
 Üç Kuruş (2021–22) as Oktay

Awards 
 Ministry of Culture and Tourism – 1989: Best Script Award for Kör Buluşma
 İsmet Küntay Awards – 1994: Best Playwright Award for Kıyamet Sularında
 Avni Dilligil Awards – 1996: Best Playwright Award for Kıyamet Sularında
 Cevdet Kudret Literature Awards – 1997: Best Play Award for Sokağa Çıkma Yasağı
 Avni Dilligil Awards – 2000:  Best Playwright Award for Sokağa Çıkma Yasağı
 43rd Antalya Golden Orange Film Festival – 2006: Best Supporting Actor Award for Eve Dönüş
 12th Sadri Alışık Awards – 2007: Best Supporting Actor Award for Eve Dönüş
 15th Afife Theatre Awards: Most Successful Supporting Actor of the Year Award for Bury the Dead

References

External links 
 
 
 

1955 births
2022 deaths
Turkish male film actors
Turkish male television actors
Turkish male stage actors
Best Supporting Actor Golden Orange Award winners
Turkish dramatists and playwrights
Turkish theatre directors
TED Ankara College Foundation Schools alumni
Hacettepe University Ankara State Conservatory alumni
Male actors from Ankara
Deaths from lung cancer in Turkey
Burials at Zincirlikuyu Cemetery